Dr. Georg Menzinsky (26 September 1907 – 24 January 1981) was a Swedish philatelist who was added to the Roll of Distinguished Philatelists in 1957. He was chairman of the jury at the STOCKHOLMIA 55 stamp exhibition.

References

Signatories to the Roll of Distinguished Philatelists
1907 births
1981 deaths
Swedish philatelists